Ilysiakos B.C. (Greek: Ηλυσιακός Κ.Α.Ε.) is a Greek professional basketball team that is located in the Ilisia neighborhood of Zografou, Athens, Greece. The club's name is said to be a reference to Elysium, which is why the club's name and logo beings with a Greek alphabet Η, instead of an Ι, even though the name of Ilissia, where the club is based, begins with an Ι in Greek. However, when the name is translated into the English alphabet, the H becomes an I.

The club is known for being based mostly on Greek players and Greek coaches, and for developing young players.

History
The parent athletic sports club, Ilysiakos Athlitikos Omilos (Greek: Ηλυσιακός Αθλητικός Όμιλος), was founded in 1927. The basketball team of Ilysiakos was established in 1968. In the 1986–87 season, Ilysiakos participated for the first time in the top Greek Basket League, and stayed there for two straight seasons. Following the 1987–88 season, the team got relegated to the Greek 2nd Division.

From 1988 to 2003, the club was competing in the Greek second and third divisions. However, the club had its biggest success with its participation in the final four of the Greek Cup in 1995, where the team finished in 4th place. In the year 2003, the club got promoted to the first division again, but was once again relegated to the second division after the 2003–04 season.

The club's second return to the first division, in the 2009–10 season, was much more successful, as Ilysiakos played in the top division for 5 consecutive seasons. During that time, players like Vonteego Cummings, Brent Petway, Terrell Stoglin, and Aloysius Anagonye played with the club. In this same era of the club, Nikos Chatzis, who was a member of the senior men's Greek national team, and won several titles in his playing career: 2 Greek Cups (2000, 2001), the FIBA Saporta Cup (2000), and the Greek League championship (2002), became the captain of the team. In this same time, Panagiotis Kafkis and Georgios Apostolidis, who also represented Greece, were also members of the team.

Arena
Ilysaiakos plays its home games at the 1,700 seat Antonis Fotsis Indoor Hall. The arena is named in honor of Ilysiakos player Antonis Fotsis.

Club titles and honors
2× Greek 2nd Division Champion: (1985, 1986)
Greek 4th Division Champion: (2001)
Greek 3rd Division Champion: (2002)

Roster

Notable players

  Tasos Antonakis
  Georgios Apostolidis
  Ioannis Athanasoulas
  Ioannis Athinaiou
  Marios Batis
  Georgios Bogris
  Kostas Charissis
  Nikos Chatzis
  Periklis Dorkofikis
  Petros Fikaris
  Antonis Fotsis
  Andreas Glyniadakis
  Vassilis Goumas
  Stelios Ioannou
  Panagiotis Kafkis
  Andreas Kanonidis
  Sakis Karidas
  Leonidas Kaselakis
  Georgios Kastrinakis
  Dimitrios Kokolakis
  Dimitrios Kompodietas
  Alexis Kyritsis
  Nikos Liakopoulos
  Marios Matalon
  Charis Papageorgiou
  Nikos Papanikolopoulos
  Andreas Papantoniou
  Nondas Papantoniou
  Michael Paragyios
  Stratos Perperoglou
  Alekos Petroulas
  Leonidas Skoutaris
  Ioannis Sioutis
  Dimitrios Tsarouchas
  Kyriakos Vidas
  Anatoly Zourpenko
  Brett Eppehimer
  Conor Grace
  Kyle Johnson
  Grega Mali
  Darius Maskoliūnas
  Harding Nana
  Riste Stefanov
  Miroslav Todić
  Aloysius Anagonye
  Jimmy Baxter
  Brian Butch
  Warren Carter
  Vonteego Cummings
  Willie Deane
  Tyrone Grant
  Othello Hunter
  Art Long
  Dominique Morrison
  Brent Petway
  Terrell Stoglin

Head coaches

References

External links
Ilysiakos B.C. - Official Website 
Eurobasket.com Team Page

Basketball teams established in 1968
Basketball teams in Greece